Censorship in the West Bank is the practice of controlling the content of what media within the West Bank were permitted to state, and what was, in various periods, denied free expression.

Israeli occupation, 1967–present
In the West Bank both the British Mandatory "Defense Emergency Regulations of 1945, No. 88" – stipulating that "every article, picture, advertisement, decree and death notice must be submitted to military censors", – and "Israeli Military Order No. IOI (1967)", amended by "Order No. 718 (1977)" and "No. 938 (1981)" concerning "the prohibition of incitement and adverse propaganda" formed the basis for censoring West Bank publications, poetry and literary productions. The problem was that no guidelines clarified precisely what could or could not be said, and even articles translated directly from the Hebrew press could be prohibited, or love poems free of any nationalistic undertone could be suppressed from publication by a censor, or theatrical pieces approved in Israel could be blocked by arbitrary fiat by any military governor, or staging denied by simply not replying to requests for permission. Newspapers could lose their licenses, without any reason given, on the basis of 1945 Emergency Regulation (Article 92/2). There were two distinct censorship bureaus, one run by the military and the other by the civil administration, and what was allowed by one could be overturned by the other, and this double procedure applied to galley proofs of every article in newspapers.
In the first decades of occupation, Palestinian publications were vetted and numerous books were censored to remove any phrase or expression which was considered as "incitement" or fostering national feelings among the Palestinians. Thus even obituaries stating that a family "in the homeland and the diaspora mourns" the deceased was struck out. Coverage of Israel's 1982 invasion of Lebanon in Jerusalem's Arabic papers, and particularly condolence notices, were severely curtailed. The word "pride" used in an obituary for the fallen was objected to. Editors were harassed and papers closed for containing articles critical of settlements.

Censorship even extended to denying travel permits for notable Palestinians like Elias Freij, Major of Bethlehem, scheduled to be interviewed in the US on NBC's Meet the Press. That war, according to several Israeli observers like Ze'ev Schiff, Yehoshafat Harkabi and Avner Yaniv, was itself strategically motivated as necessary to "safeguard the occupation of the West Bank." When Yitzhak Laor appealed to the Israeli Supreme Court about the way the censorship board censored his play – which made analogies between the military government in the territory and Nazism, the Court backed the plaintiff, leading to the board's suspension. The court's decision had no effect on the military's censorship body in the West Bank and Gaza, and plays can be closed if it is thought their content threatens Israel's security.
Graffiti (shi'arati) are a major medium for protesting occupation and flourished under the First Intifada. They were illegal by the fact that they were written without obtaining a permit. Julie Peteet states that "it was illegal to write for public dissemination without submission of the text to the censors". Under Military Order 1260 promulgated in November 1988, Israeli military authorities could fine $350 the owner of any property on whose walls the graffiti artist had written a slogan or painted a picture. This proved to be so lucrative a source of revenue for the Israelis that the intifada authorities themselves had to prohibit the practice. Soldiers blacked out or scrubbed walls of graffiti, or when incised, had them chiselled off: when book-long collections of such graffiti were published, they were banned by the military censor. Even works unrelated to the conflict have been banned in the occupied territories, as was Hamlet. Fathi Ghabin received a 6-month gaol sentence for using the PLO colours – red, black, green, and white – in one of his paintings.

Under the Palestinian Authority, 1995–present

The Palestinian National Authority also uses censorship. As early as 1996 it forbade circulation of Edward Said's Peace and Its Discontents.

Notes

Citations

Sources

Censorship in the State of Palestine
Mass media in Israel
Mass media in Palestine (region)
West Bank